Westward Ho may refer to:

Arts and entertainment

Literature
 Westward Ho (play), a 1604 play by John Webster and Thomas Dekker
 Westward Ho!, an 1832 novel by James Kirke Paulding
 Westward Ho! (novel), an 1855 British historical novel by Charles Kingsley

Film
 Westward Ho! (1919 film), a silent film based on the novel of the same name
 Westward Ho (1935 film), starring John Wayne
 Westward Ho! (1940 film), a British public information film
 Westward Ho (1942 film), one in a series of western films known as The Three Mesquiteers
 Westward Ho! (1988 film), an animated film produced by Burbank Films Australia

Songs
 "Westward Ho", performed by Westside Connection on the album Bow Down
 "Westward Ho", by John Parr from the 1990 film Go Trabi Go
 "Westward Ho!", by Moondog
 "Westward Ho! - Massive Letdown", a 2014 song by Half Man Half Biscuit
 "Westward Ho!", a 2014 album by Police Dog Hogan

Others
 Custer's Revenge, a 1982 Atari 2600 video game also called Westward Ho 
 Westward the Course of Empire Takes Its Way, a mural by Emanuel Leutze, popular name Westward Ho

Places

England
 Westward Ho!, a village in Devon,
 Westward Ho, a district of Grimsby, Lincolnshire
 Royal North Devon Golf Club, also known as Westward Ho!

North America
 University Golf Club, British Columbia, Canada, original name Westward Ho!
 Westward Ho (Phoenix), a landmark hotel in Phoenix, Arizona, US
 Westward Ho Hotel and Casino, a defunct hotel and casino in Las Vegas, US
 Westward Ho, Alberta, an unincorporated community in Canada

Transportation
 Westward Ho, a GWR 3031 Class locomotive

Ships
 Westward Ho! (clipper), an 1852 California, US clipper
 USS Westward Ho (ID-3098), a ship built by Columbia River Shipbuilding
 Westward Ho TN 54, a smack from the Sloop period, Faroe Islands

Other uses
 Operation 'Westward Ho', a UK government scheme to resettle displaced persons as European Voluntary Workers in UK after the Second World War

See also
 Bideford, Westward Ho! and Appledore Railway, England
 Westward Ho the Wagons!, a 1956 film starring Fess Parker and George Reeves
 Westward Ha!, a 1948 collection of miscellaneous pieces by S. J. Perelman
 Westward Whoa, a 1936 Looney Tunes short film
 Worstward Ho, a 1983 Samuel Beckett text
 Eastward Hoe, a 1605 satire on the 1604 play
 Northward Ho, a 1607 response to the preceding 
 Inward Ho, a 1923 collection of essays by the journalist Christopher Morley
 Southward Ho, a 1939 film starring Roy Rogers
 Spaceward Ho!, a video game first released in 1990